Hickory Creek is a tributary of the Delaware River in Plumstead Township, Bucks County, Pennsylvania, in the United States.

History
Hickory Creek's name was due to the abundance of hickory trees in the area. It was once regarded as the border between the villages of Point Pleasant and Lower Black Eddy.

Statistics
Hickory Creek is located entirely within Plumstead Township, Bucks County, Pennsylvania. Its GNIS I.D. number is 1176953. Its U.S. Geological I.D. number is 3109.

Course
Hickory rises near Tollgate Road, southeast of Ferry Road and flows northeast  to the Delaware River.

Geology
Appalachian Highlands Division
Piedmont Province
Piedmont Lowland Section
Diabase
Hickory Creek lies in a sliver of diabase rock which intruded into the Lockatong Formation of the Piedmont Lowland during the Jurassic and the Triassic, occurring as a sill of dense, dark gray to black and very fine grained, 90-95% labradorite and augite.

Crossings and Bridges

See also
List of rivers of the United States
List of rivers of Pennsylvania
List of Delaware River tributaries

References

Rivers of Bucks County, Pennsylvania
Rivers of Pennsylvania
Tributaries of the Delaware River